Voices of Future Generations for the Middle East Region (VoFG Arabia , Arabic: أصوات أجيال المستقبل) is a writing initiative that promotes sustainability and the United Nations convention on the Rights of the Child. Sheikha Hissa Hamdan bin Rashid Al Maktoum is the Goodwill Ambassador of this initiative. In 2014, VoFG was launched internationally, whereas the launch of the Voices of Future Generations for the Middle East region was in 2019 .The initiative organizes a writing competition for students aging between 8 to 12 years, which encourages young writers to incorporate the Sustainable Development Goals and the United Nations convention on the Rights of the Child into their stories.

Child Author and Ambassador

Ambassador 
The Voices of Future Generations (VoFG) programme, under the patronage of UNESCO, appointed Sheikah Hissa bint Hamdan bin Rashid Al Maktoum as a Goodwill Ambassador for the Gulf Region. Whereas the Emirates Literature Foundation confirmed as consultants for the project for the next five years.

Child Authors

Round 1 Winner

English 
 Saira Thomas (First Place)
 Sashini Manikandan (Second Place)
 Shahid Fayis (Third Place)
 Hazza Mohamed Rashed Al Ameri
 Meghna Senthil Kumar

 Ioana Teodorova Stefanova
 Abrar Ahmed Sirohey
 Mir Faraz
 Aditi Gandhi
 Joshua Melwin

Arabic 

 Saoud Ahmad Salem Alkabi (First Place)
 Abdulkarim Ghazal (Second Place)
 Ahmed Ismail Zindah (Third Place)
 Nour Ahmed Alkhatib
 Ward Wissam AlHalabi
 Al Yaziah Salah Al Din Khamis Hilal Al Kaabi
 Matra Ibrahim Salem Fairouz
 Aamna Hamad Salem Obaid Saif Al Suwaidi
 Lama Ehab Almousa
 Suhaila Abdelhaleem Mansour

Round 2 Winner

English 

 Abrar Ahmed Sirohey (First Place)
 Kripa Dixit (Second Place)
 Inayah Fathima Faeez (Third Place)
 Diniru Sathnidu Dissanayake
 Mirana Gabin Mathew
 Danial Petric
 Mara Machado-Mullet
 Jaivardhan Manish Nawani
 Shaivi Kalwani
 Ethan Dsouza
 Advay Saravana Kumar

Arabic 

 Abdulla Ismail Abushabab (First Place)
 Seba Awadh Mohammed Almusad (Second Place)
 Mezna Najeeb (Third Place)
 Hassan Nidal Hassam Awad
 Hazza Ali Salem Mohamed Al Yileili
 Mariam Eslam Mostafa Kandiel
 Abdullah Mohammad Abdullah Alrabab'ah
 Maktom Salim Khamis Salim Almazrouei
 Aamna Hamad Salem Obaid Saif Al Suwaidi
 Salim Ahmed Salim Alkaabi
 Hania Asaad Sherif

Illustrators

Round 1 

 Haifa Malhas
 Aisha Hilal
 Alya Abdelrahim AlHamadi
 Ari Puguh
 Asma Enayeh
 Asmaa Alhosan
 Aysha Al Hamrani
 Dina Fawakhiri
 Khadija Al Saeedi

 Khulood Ghuloom Aljana
 Nouf Alismail
 Sanaa Al Maktoum
 Sarah Mohamed Hammad
 Stacey Siebritz
 Sura Ghazwan
 Abdul Jabbar
 Tarfa Khalid
 Tasneem Amiruddin
 Wafa Ibrahim

Round 2 

 Tarfa Khalid
 Ari Puguh
 Alya Abdelrahim AlHamadi
 Asmaa Alhosani
 Khadija Al Saeedi
 Sanaa Al Maktoum
 Khulood Ghuloom Aljanahi
 Sarah Mohamed Hammad
 Tasneem Amiruddin

 Sura Ghazwan Abdul Jabbar
 Stacey Siebritz
 Aisha Hilal
 Aysha Al Hamrani
 Dina Fawakhiri
 Ayesha Almheiri
 Maryah Al Rashed
 Zainab Khaleel
 Basma Hosam 
 Maitha Al Khayat
 Noha Gmal
 Marion Battaglia 
 Esraa Magdy Gaber

Publications 
 Young Voices of Arabia (the 2020 collection), the Emirates literature Foundation, 2020 (EN)
 Young Voices of Arabia (the 2020 collection) (original title: أصوات شابة من شبه الجزيرة العربية), the Emirates Literature Foundation, 2020
 Young Voices of Arabic (the 2021 collection), ELF Publishing, 2021 (EN)

References 

2019 establishments
International sustainability organizations
2019 in the United Arab Emirates